

This is a list of the National Register of Historic Places listings in Middlesex County, Connecticut.

There are 123 properties and districts listed on the National Register of Historic Places in Middlesex County, Connecticut, United States. Tabulated here are 89 places; see National Register of Historic Places listings in Middletown, Connecticut for 34 more; the oyster sloop Christeen was located in Middlesex County when listed in 1991, but relocated to Oyster Bay, New York in 1992. Including those in Middletown, there are three National Historic Landmarks among the listings.

The locations of National Register properties and districts for which the latitude and longitude coordinates are included below, may be seen in an online map.

Current listings (excluding Middletown)

|}

Formerly listed, and other status

|}

See also

List of National Historic Landmarks in Connecticut
National Register of Historic Places listings in Connecticut

References

 
 
Middlesex